The 1981 Irish general election to the 22nd Dáil was held on Thursday, 11 June, following the dissolution of the 21st Dáil on 21 May by President Patrick Hillery on the request of Taoiseach Charles Haughey. The general election took place in 41 Dáil constituencies throughout Ireland for 166 seats in Dáil Éireann, the house of representatives of the Oireachtas. The number of seats in the Dáil was increased by 18 from 148 under the Electoral (Amendment) Act 1980.

The 22nd Dáil met at Leinster House on 30 June to nominate the Taoiseach for appointment by the president and to approve the appointment of a new government of Ireland. Garret FitzGerald was appointed Taoiseach, forming the 17th Government of Ireland, a minority coalition government of Fine Gael and the Labour Party.

Campaign 
The general election of 1981 was the first one of five during the 1980s. The election also saw three new leaders of the three main parties fight their first general election. Charles Haughey had become Taoiseach and leader of Fianna Fáil at the end of 1979, Garret FitzGerald was the new leader of Fine Gael and Frank Cluskey was leading the Labour Party.

Haughey and Fianna Fáil seemed extremely popular with the electorate in early 1981. He was expected to call the election at the time of the Fianna Fáil ardfheis on 14 February, but the Stardust fire caused the ardfheis to be postponed, and the Republican hunger strike in the Maze Prison began in March. By the dissolution in May, much of the earlier optimism in the party had filtered out. The Anti H-Block movement fielded abstentionist candidates in solidarity with the hunger strikers, undermining the Republican credentials of Fianna Fáil.

Fianna Fáil's manifesto promised more spending programmes and Fine Gael put forward a series of tax-cutting plans.

Result 

|}
Independents include Independent Fianna Fáil (13,546 votes, 1 seat).

Voting summary

Seats summary

Government formation 
Fianna Fáil lost seats as a result of sympathy to the Anti H-Block candidates and the attractive tax proposals of Fine Gael. It was the worst performance for Fianna Fáil in twenty years. Meanwhile, Labour Party leader Frank Cluskey lost his seat, necessitating a leadership change with Michael O'Leary succeeding Cluskey. A Fine Gael–Labour Party coalition government came to power. Fine Gael and the Labour Party formed the 17th Government of Ireland, a minority coalition government, with Garret FitzGerald becoming Taoiseach.

Dáil membership changes 
The following changes took place at this election:
20 outgoing TDs retired
18 additional seats added to the Dáil
127 outgoing TDs stood for re-election (also Pádraig Faulkner, the outgoing Ceann Comhairle who was automatically returned)
109 of those were re-elected
18 failed to be re-elected
56 successor TDs were elected
50 were elected for the first time
6 had previously been TDs
There were 7 successor female TDs, replacing 3 outgoing, increasing the total by 4 to 11.

Where more than one change took place in a constituency the concept of successor is an approximation for presentation only.
Where a number of related constituency changes took place in an area, such as Cork, the outgoing constituency for retiring TDs and the allocation of new seats are approximations for presentation only.
Outgoing TDs re-elected in a new constituency, with no related changes, are not recorded as a change

See also 
Members of the 15th Seanad

Notes

References

Further reading 

1981 in Irish politics
1981
22nd Dáil
June 1981 events in Europe
General election, 1981
1981 Irish hunger strike